Cantha is a genus of skippers in the family Hesperiidae.

Species
Recognised species in the genus Cantha include:
 Cantha calva Evans, 1955
 Cantha zara (Bell, 1941)

References

Natural History Museum Lepidoptera genus database

Hesperiinae
Hesperiidae genera